, fifth son of Michinaga, was a kugyo of the Heian period. His mother was Minamoto no Rinshi (源 倫子), daughter of Minamoto no Masanobu. Regent Yorimichi, Empress Shōshi (consort of Emperor Ichijō), Empress Kenshi (consort of Emperor Sanjō) were his brother and sisters from the same mother. In 1068, the year when his daughter married Emperor Go-Reizei, he took the position of Kampaku, regent. He, however, lost the power when Emperor Go-Sanjo, who was not a relative of the Fujiwara clan, assumed the throne. This contributed to the later decline of the Fujiwara clan.

Marriages and children
In 1012, he was married to a daughter of Fujiwara no Kinto by a daughter of Prince Akihira (son of Emperor Murakami), (1000–1024).
 Seishi (or Nariko) (生子) (1014–1068), - married to Emperor Go-Suzaku in 1039
 Shinshi (or Saneko) (真子) (1016–1087) - Naishi-no-kami 1042–1087
 Nobuie (信家) (1018–1061) - adopted by his uncle Yorimichi
 Michimoto (通基) (1021–1041)
 Kanshi (or Yoshiko) (歓子) (1021–1102) - Empress of Emperor Go-Reizei
 Nobunaga (信長) (1022–1094) - Daijō Daijin
 Jōkaku (静覚) (1025–1083) - provisional Major Bishop, Head priest of Gedatsu-ji (temple)

In 1026, he was married to Imperial Princess Shishi (禔子内親王) (1003–1048), daughter of Emperor Sanjō by Fujiwara no Seishi. From this marriage he had no children.

In 1051, he was married to Princess Senshi (嫥子女王) (1005–1074), the third daughter of Imperial Prince Tomohira (son of Emperor Murakami). From this marriage he had no children.

He was familiar with Koshikibu no Naishi (小式部内侍) (real name is unknown) (died 1025), daughter of Tachibana no Michisada and Lady Izumi Shikibu.
 Jōen (静円) (1016–1074) - provisional Archbishop

References
 Nihonshi Shoka Keizu Jimmei Jiten, Owada,T. et al. 2003, Kodansya. (Japanese)
 Ōkagami, Hosaka,H.(translation into modern Japanese) 1981, Kodansya. (Japanese)

996 births
1075 deaths
Fujiwara clan